The 2010 Volta ao Algarve was the 36th edition of the Volta ao Algarve cycling stage race. It was held from 17 to 21 February 2010, and was rated as a 2.1 event on the UCI Europe Tour. It started at the Algarve Stadium in Faro and ended with an individual time trial in Portimão.

This edition of the race was noted as a race which was targeted by many notable riders as their first of the season. Among these riders beginning 2010 in Portugal was reigning Tour de France champion (and defending Volta ao Algarve champion) Alberto Contador.

Teams and cyclists
There were 23 teams in the 2010 Volta ao Algarve. Among them were 12 UCI ProTour teams, five UCI Professional Continental teams, and six Continental teams. Each team was allowed eight riders on their squad, but  sent only seven, giving the event a peloton of 183 cyclists at its outset.

The 23 teams in the race were:

UCI ProTour Teams

UCI Professional Continental Teams

UCI Continental Teams
An Post–Sean Kelly
Barbot–Siper
C C Loulé–Louletano
LA–Rota dos Móveis
Madeinvox–Boavista
Palmeiras Resort–Tavira

Many notable riders contested the event as their first or one of their first of the season. This was the first race since the 2009 Tour de France for Astana's Alberto Contador. Thor Hushovd from  intended to make his debut earlier in the season, at the Étoile de Bessèges, but illness forced him to delay his season debut. Euskaltel–Euskadi's Samuel Sánchez and the Garmin-Transitions pair of Christian Vande Velde and David Zabriskie also made their first appearances of 2010 in this event, while for Caisse d'Epargne's Luis León Sánchez it was his second, after the Tour Down Under. The RadioShack squad did not include Lance Armstrong, but the new American team did send Levi Leipheimer and Andreas Klöden, with both making their European debuts for 2010 in this race.

Tour stages

Stage 1
17 February 2010 – Algarve Stadium to Albufeira, 

Though the stage seemed set to end with a mass sprint finish, ' Benoît Vaugrenard put in a winning attack  from the finish line, foiling the hopes of, among others,  sprint ace André Greipel. Vaugrenard's attack came moments after Joan Horrach of  tried a similar move, but was unable to maintain first position all the way to the line as Vaugrenard was.

Stage 2
18 February 2010 – Sagres to Lagos, 

The second stage was similar in profile to the first, jagged with several short climbs. Four of the hills awarded points toward the mountains classification.

This stage was marked by heavy rainfall that made for tough riding for the peloton. Despite a profile that did not seem that it would break the field up so much, 78 riders finished more than ten minutes behind the stage winner, and 28 of them more than twenty minutes back. Thirteen did not finish the stage at all.

With four others, 's David Vitoria broke away  into the stage. His advantage at that point was 3' 30", which meant there was a chance he could win the stage. In a finish reminiscent of the first stage, when Vaugrenard denied the sprinters, Vitoria stayed away into the stage's final kilometer. He was, however, caught by Greipel  from the finish line. The German from Team HTC–Columbia took the stage win and, by virtue of the time bonuses it afforded, the overall leadership.

Stage 3
19 February 2010 – Castro Marim to Malhão, 

The third stage was difficult, with four categorized climbs coming in the final , including a summit stage finish.

Repeated early crashes in this stage sent Gert Steegmans, Manuel Cardoso, and Sandy Casar out of the race and to hospitals, though all escaped serious injury. The  team, in particular David de la Fuente, did strong pacemaking, trying to thin the field and set up their leader Alberto Contador for victory. 's Nelson Oliviera was the last rider brought back in from the morning escape, just as the ascent to the stage-ending Alto do Malhão began. On this climb, Contador put in the attack that separated him from the field and gave him the stage victory, with the  duo of Tiago Machado and Contador's former teammate Levi Leipheimer the next two behind him on the road. Contador also became the third straight stage winner to pull on the yellow jersey as race leader.

Stage 4
20 February 2010 – Cacela to Tavira, 

Stage 4 had a sloping profile, with a high climb coming at the  mark. Many kilometers of descending followed to the finish line.

After  of racing, a six-man breakaway formed. Its complexion changed after the first climb of the day, when three riders were dropped and three bridged from the peloton up to the leading group. The best-placed man in the breakaway was 's Imanol Erviti, who began the stage 5' 11" behind race leader Contador. The Astana team never let the break get more than five minutes' advantage, content to otherwise let the stage be decided among those riders. The six finished scattered as they crossed the finish line, with Team RadioShack's Sébastien Rosseler securing their first-ever victory, exactly three minutes ahead of the peloton, and 's Iljo Keisse in sixth just ten seconds ahead of the main field. There was no significant change to the race's general classification after the stage.

Stage 5
21 February 2010 – Laguna to Portimão,  (individual time trial)

The race's individual time trial is straightforward, with only three curves in the road and several long straightaways, along with a negligible change in elevation. One wrinkle was thrown into the race, however, two days before the time trial was run. The UCI disallowed the Specialized Shiv time trial bike. This affected both the Astana and Saxo Bank teams, who both ride Specialized bikes, but most notably race leader Contador. Specialized delivered the teams a different model of team trial bike to the teams for use in the stage.

 rider Luis León Sánchez won this time trial, with a time of 21'32". Contador, atop a Specialized Transitions bike instead of the Shiv he had expected to use, was second, 13 seconds slower than Sánchez. He still had more than enough time in hand to win the race overall. Caisse d'Epargne and Team RadioShack both showed well in the time trial, with three riders each in the top ten.

Classification leadership
In the 2010 Volta ao Algarve, five different jerseys were awarded. For the general classification, calculated by adding each cyclist's finishing times on each stage, and allowing time bonuses for the first three finishers on each stage and in intermediate sprints, the leader received a yellow jersey. This classification was considered the most important of the Volta ao Algarve, and the winner is considered the winner of the Volta.

Additionally, there was a sprints classification, which awarded a blue jersey. In the sprints classification, cyclists got points for finishing in the top three in an intermediate sprint. The first across the sprint points got 3 points, the second got 2, and the third got a single point.

There was also a mountains classification, which awarded a green jersey. In the mountains classification, points were won by reaching the top of a mountain before other cyclists. Each climb was categorized, with the more difficult climbs awarding more points.

The points classification awarded a white jersey. In the points classification, cyclists got points based on the order at the finish line of each stage. The stage win afforded 25 points, second on the stage was worth 20, third 16, fourth 13, fifth 10, sixth 8, seventh 6, eighth 4, ninth 2, and tenth was worth a single point. The points awarded in the sprints classification counted equivalently for this classification.

The fifth jersey was distinct to this race – it was for the best Portuguese rider. There were eleven Portuguese riders in the race, who competed amongst themselves for a pink jersey.

The race also awarded a teams classification, which was not represented by a jersey. The teams classification was calculated by adding the times of each team's best three riders per stage per day.

References

2010
2010 in Portuguese sport
Volta ao Algarce